Qué hombre tan sin embargo is a 1967 Mexican comedy-drama film directed by Julián Soler and produced by Gregorio Walerstein. It stars Eulalio González "Piporro", Julissa, Enrique Rambal, and Lucy Gallardo in the leading roles.

Synopsis
An angel, disguised as a witty vagabond named Filomeno and instructed by God, becomes the butler of an affluent and excessively materialistic family.

Cast

Eulalio Gonzalez as Filomeno
Julissa as Laura
Enrique Rambal as Don Jaime
Lucy Gallardo as Doña María
León Michel as Hipólito "Polo" 
Ricardo Carrión as Raúl
Óscar Ortiz de Pinedo as Lucrecio 
Jessica Munguía as Laura's friend
Sergio Ramos as a lawyer
Juan Salido as Jorge
Silvia Fuentes as Laura's friend
Conjunto de los Hermanos Carreón as the band at the party
Hilda Aguirre as Rosa

Production
Principal photography commenced on 25 November 1965 at the Estudios San Ángel in Mexico City and ended on 22 December 1965.

Casting
The film featured the "accidental" cinematic debut of actress Hilda Aguirre; her father (José María Aguirre) was a friend of producer Gregorio Walerstein. Aguirre's father had told the producer that he had a "half-crazy daughter who wanted to work in cinema." The producer then set up an appointment with Aguirre, made her walk, laugh, and talk, closely observing her, and then told her: "You're hired for three years." She started shooting her scenes in the film on November 1965.

The film also featured Ricardo Carrión's "first role of importance."

Soundtrack
"El Abuelo Yeh Yeh," written and performed by Eulalio González with Los Hermanos Carrión.
"Quiereme," written and performed by Eulalio González.
"Puros Hombres de Delito," written and performed by Eulalio González.

References

External links
 

1967 films
1967 comedy-drama films
Mexican comedy-drama films
Cima Films films
1960s Spanish-language films
1960s Mexican films